Danny Wicks (born 5 December 1985) is an Australian former professional rugby league footballer. From September 2011 to March 2013, Wicks served an eighteen-month prison sentence for trafficking drugs.

Background
Born in Grafton, New South Wales, Wicks played his junior football for the Grafton Ghosts, before being signed by the St. George Illawarra Dragons.

Playing career

Early career
In 2006, Wicks played for the St. George Illawarra Dragons New South Wales Cup team.

2006
In round 10 of the 2006 NRL season, Wicks made his NRL debut for St. George Illawarra against the New Zealand Warriors.  Wicks made 17 appearances in his debut season including the preliminary final defeat against Melbourne. He scored a try on debut.

2007

In 2007, Wicks signed a three-year contract with the Newcastle Knights starting in 2008, following Brian Smith's clean out of the club.  In a 2008 interview, Smith referred to Wicks as "Wicksy".

2009
In December 2009, Wicks was arrested for supplying prohibited drugs and possession of prohibited drugs. After being released on bail, he quit the Knights "so the club can move forward".

2010
In 2010, Wicks played for the Grafton Ghosts while his matter was in the courts, eventually being sentenced to eighteen months in prison.

2014
In May 2014, Wicks' agent started approaching clubs about the possibility of signing him to a contract for 2015, with his four-year WADA suspension for drugs ending in September 2014. During his stay in prison, Wicks lost 20 kilograms to get back to his old playing weight of 106 kilograms. On 30 October 2014, he signed a 1-year contract with the Parramatta Eels starting in 2015. He made his return to the NRL in round 2 of the 2015 NRL season against the Canterbury-Bankstown Bulldogs. On 11 April 2015, he re-signed with the Eels on a one-year contract. In August 2015, Wicks resigned on a two-year deal with Parramatta.

2016
In November 2016, Wicks announced his immediate retirement from professional rugby league despite signing a two-year contract extension with the Parramatta Eels earlier that year.

2017
On 13 July 2017 it was revealed that Wicks had resumed playing on the NSW Mid North Coast with Group 2 side the Grafton Ghosts. He captain-coached the team to win both a premiership and the NSW Country Rugby League's Clayton Cup.

Drug conviction
On 16 December 2009, Wicks was arrested and charged with eight drug related offences, including six counts of supplying a prohibited drug and two counts of possessing a prohibited drug. Police said that Strike Force Welham had been set up to investigate the supply of amphetamine, cocaine and ecstasy in the Clarence Valley region. Wicks was arrested as he drove his car along Brunker Road, Adamstown at around 6:30am, as part of coordinated police raids in four locations. In September 2011, he was sentenced to a maximum of three years in jail after being found guilty of trafficking drugs. He was released on 29 March 2013 after serving eighteen months of a three-year sentence at Glen Innes Correctional Centre.

References

External links
2015 Parramatta Eels profile
NRL profile

1985 births
Living people
21st-century Australian criminals
Australian drug traffickers
Australian people convicted of drug offences
Australian rugby league players
Criminals from New South Wales
Drug dealers
Kurri Kurri Bulldogs players
Newcastle Knights players
Parramatta Eels players
Rugby league players from Grafton, New South Wales
Rugby league props
St. George Illawarra Dragons players
Wentworthville Magpies players